Devils Brook is a tributary of the Millstone River in central New Jersey in the United States.

It is a moderately large brook with numerous unnamed tributaries.

Course
It flows west, following Friendship Road. It then passes through the Plainsboro Preserve, feeding a marsh. It joins with Shallow Brook, its tributary, and crosses Scudders Mill Road, also known as CR-614. It crosses Princeton-Plainsboro Road in a dammed section known as Gordon Pond.

Accessibility
The Devils Brook drains a large area in Mercer and Middlesex counties. There are many tributaries that cross roads, so it is easily accessible.

Tributaries
Shallow Brook

Sister tributaries
Beden Brook
Bear Brook
Cranbury Brook
Harrys Brook
Heathcote Brook
Indian Run Brook
Little Bear Brook
Millstone Brook
Peace Brook
Rocky Brook
Royce Brook
Simonson Brook
Six Mile Run
Stony Brook
Ten Mile Run
Van Horn Brook

See also
List of rivers of New Jersey

References

External links
USGS Coordinates in Google Maps

Tributaries of the Raritan River
Rivers of New Jersey
Rivers of Mercer County, New Jersey
Rivers of Middlesex County, New Jersey